Sokołów  is a village in the administrative district of Gmina Gostynin, within Gostynin County, Masovian Voivodeship, in east-central Poland.

The village has a population of 230.

References

Villages in Gostynin County